The CAMIE Awards, sometimes known as the CAMIEs, are awards for outstanding, uplifting films emphasizing character and morality. They are awarded annually by CAMIE Awards, Inc.

Overview

The word CAMIE is an acronym for "Character And Morality In Entertainment". The CAMIE awards are given to films which emphasize character and morality. They were established to "encourage the production and awareness of outstanding, uplifting, and entertaining motion pictures with positive role models for building character, overcoming adversity, correcting unwise choices, strengthening families, living moral lives, and solving life’s problems with integrity and perseverance." In the annual awards show, rather than giving "best actor" or "best film" awards, the CAMIEs give each film 10 statues to be divided among people who contributed at all levels of production. including both actors and film-makers. In addition to the film awards, special awards are also sometimes given; Richard Dutcher received one such award at the 2001 ceremony.

History and organization
The CAMIEs were founded in 2001 by Dr. Glen C. Griffin, who also founded a companion movie-reviewing site, Moviepicks.org.

CAMIE Awards, Inc., is led by a Board of Trustees, composed of
Dr. Glen C. Griffin, Founder and Chairman
Dr. R. Christopher Barden, President
Richard D. Bradford
Janet Lee Chamberlain
Jeffery Goddard
Craig F. McCullough
Levor Oldham

The Board of Trustees is assisted by an Advisory Board, which contains such notables as (not a complete list)

Billy Davis, Jr.
Debby Boone
Chris Cannon
Leanza Cornett
Dr. Rodger Dean Duncan
Danny Gans
Clint Holmes
Olivia Hussey
Shirley Jones
Rabbi Daniel Lapin
Marilyn McCoo
Michael Medved
Gerald Molen
Alan Osmond
Dr. Laura Schlessinger
Leigh Steinberg
Mark Steines
Jon Voight

Sean Hannity was also formerly on the advisory board.

The Awards

2001 CAMIE Winners, for films released in 1999/2000 - Ceremony held Feb 20, 2001, at Memorial House in Salt Lake City.
Theatrical Releases
Remember the Titans
Toy Story 2
Made for TV 
Anne of Green Gables: The Continuing Story
A Season for Miracles
The Last Dance 
The Loretta Claiborne Story
The Lost Child
The Miracle Worker

2003 CAMIE Winners, for films released in 2001/2002
Theatrical Releases
The Other Side of Heaven
The Rookie
Made for TV 
Love Comes Softly
Miss Lettie and Me
The Locket

2005 CAMIE Winners, for films released in 2003/2004 - Ceremony held Jan 29, 2005 at the Hollywood Renaissance theater in Hollywood.
Theatrical Releases
Miracle
Radio
Saints and Soldiers
Made for TV 
Fallen Angel
Love's Enduring Promise
Secret Santa

2006 CAMIE Winners, for films released in 2005, at the Wilshire Theater in Beverly Hills
Theatrical Releases
Dreamer
I am David
March of the Penguins
Pride & Prejudice 
The Chronicles of Narnia: The Lion, the Witch, and the Wardrobe
The Greatest Game Ever Played
Made for TV 
Love’s Long Journey
Pope John Paul II
The Magic of Ordinary Days
The Reading Room

2007 CAMIE Winners, for films released in 2006 - Ceremony held May 12, 2007 at the Leonard H. Goldenson Theatre in North Hollywood.

Theatrical Releases
Akeelah and the Bee
Charlotte's Web
Eight Below
One Night with the King
The Nativity Story
Made for TV 
Candles on Bay Street
Hidden Places
Mother Teresa
The Christmas Card
The Water is Wide

2008 CAMIE Winners, primarily for films released in 2007 - Ceremony held May 3, 2008 at the Wilshire Theater in Beverly Hills

Theatrical Releases
Amazing Grace
Bridge to Terabithia
Miss Potter
Nancy Drew
The Ultimate Gift
Made for TV 
Crossroads: A Story of Forgivenss
Love's Unending Legacy
Pictures of Hollis Woods
Saving Sarah Cain
The Note

References

External links
CAMIE Awards official site
Moviepicks.org, a movie review website produced by CAMIE Awards, Inc.
Starfish network preview of the 2007 CAMIE Award show

American film awards
Awards established in 2001
2001 establishments in the United States